Platte County Courthouse is a historic courthouse located at Platte City, Platte County, Missouri.  It was built in 1866–1867, and is a two-story, cruciform plan, red brick building on a limestone foundation.  It has a low pitched cross-gable roof.

It was listed on the National Register of Historic Places in 1979.

References

County courthouses in Missouri
Courthouses on the National Register of Historic Places in Missouri
Government buildings completed in 1867
Buildings and structures in Platte County, Missouri
1866 establishments in Missouri
National Register of Historic Places in Platte County, Missouri